Edmund Allen may refer to:
Edmund Allen (priest) (c. 1519–1559), English scholar and bishop-elect of Rochester
Edmund Allen (politician) (1844–1909), New Zealand politician
Edmund T. Allen (1896–1943), American test pilot

See also
Eddie Allen (disambiguation)
Edward Allen (disambiguation)